Almost all of these following scientists have published influential and well-cited articles. Furthermore, these scientists are considered producers of high-quality work outside of the positive psychology guild and publish in mainstream, top-tier psychology journals.

Albert Bandura
Kendall Cotton Bronk
Robert Biswas-Diener
Mihaly Csikszentmihalyi
Richard Davidson
Ed Diener
Carol Dweck
Barbara Fredrickson
Adam Grant
Jonathan Haidt
Todd Kashdan
Sonja Lyubomirsky
Acacia Parks
Christopher Peterson
Barry Schwartz
Martin Seligman
Santhosh Sisupal
Kennon Sheldon
C. R. Snyder
Shelley Taylor
Everett Worthington
Philip Zimbardo
Lee Chambers (psychologist)

References

External links
Positive Psychology Researchers

Positive psychology